The Iris Award is an honor for local television in the United States given by the National Association of Television Program Executives.

Iris Award may also refer to:

 , given by the Academy of Television Arts and Sciences
 Iris Award (Uruguay), radio and television awards given by the newspaper El País
 Iris Prize, an international LGBT short film award
 Prix Iris, a Canadian film award given by Québec Cinéma

See also
 Iris (disambiguation)